François-Nicolas Vincent (born 1766 or 1767; died 24 March 1794) was the Secretary General of the War Ministry in the First French Republic, and a significant figure in the French Revolution. A member of the Cordelier Club, he is best known as a radical sans-culottes leader and prominent member of the Hébertist faction.

Leadership
The son of a prison concierge and a native Parisian, Vincent worked as a lawyer's clerk and is believed to have lived in substantial poverty until 1792, at which point he became an active participant in the radical Revolutionary effort. The youngest of the men to follow Jacques Hébert, Vincent, along with fellow Hébertist Charles-Philippe Ronsin, took the Revolution to the country, becoming revolutionaries-on-a-mission. Upon his return to Paris, Vincent became more active in the Cordelier Club and was soon elected Orator. After this advancement, Vincent was eventually made General Secretary of the War Ministry under Jean Baptiste Noël Bouchotte. It is this job that allowed Vincent to bring more power to the sans-culottes.

Downfall
Jacques Hébert, writer and publisher of the La Pere Duchesne, led Vincent, among others, on a campaign against what they deemed the soft 'moderation' of the Committee of Public Safety, along with attempts to aid in the 'de-Christianization' of France. Vincent supported the overthrow of Maximilien Robespierre and when he and his fellow Hébertists became active enough in their opposition, Robespierre reacted with an arrest and trial for 'treasonous activity'. The Hébertists, along with some of their close friends and companions, were charged with attempting to overthrow the Committee of Public Safety to ensure the re-establishment of the monarchy and conspiring with foreigners to take down the Republic. No physical evidence was given to support these allegations but, even so, Vincent and his fellow Hébertists were found guilty and sentenced to death. On 24 March 1794, at the age of twenty-seven, François-Nicolas Vincent was beheaded at the guillotine along with Hébert, Ronsin, Momoro, and the other leaders of the Hébertist faction.

References

Andress, David. The Terror: The Merciless War for Freedom in Revolutionary France. (New York: Farrar, Straus and Giroux, 2006) 
Andress, David. French Society in Revolution 1789-1799. (Manchester University Press, 1999) 
Brown, Howard G. War, Revolution, and the Bureaucratic State: Politics and Army Administration in France 1791-1799. (Oxford: Oxford University Press, 1995) 
Furet, François, and Mona Ozouf. A Critical Dictionary of the French Revolution. (Harvard University Press, 1989) 
McNamara, Charles B. "The Hebertists; study of a French Revolutionary 'faction' in the reign of terror, 1793-1794". (New York : Fordham University, 1974).

1760s births
1794 deaths

Year of birth uncertain
Politicians from Paris
Hébertists
People of the French Revolution
People executed by guillotine during the French Revolution